The Balochistan University of Information Technology, Engineering, and Management Sciences (BUITEMS) is a public research university in Quetta, Balochistan, Pakistan. The Government of Balochistan chartered the university on 18 July 2002. The university officially commenced its academic activities in October, 14th 2002 with three undergraduate programs in computer science, computer engineering and business administration with an initial enrollment of 90 students. The university is structured around four campuses that focus on engineering, information technology business, arts, and life sciences consisting of 30 academic programs at undergraduate and graduate levels. As of spring 2017, the university has grown to a student strength of 9197, and a faculty of 600.

Campuses 
BUITEMS has four campuses: the City Campus which houses the Faculty of Management Sciences; the Takatu Campus, accommodating the Faculty of Information and Communication Technology, the Faculty of Life Sciences and Informatics, the Faculty of Arts and Basic Sciences and the Faculty of Engineering; the Chiltan Campus which is being developed as research forum and laboratories of the Faculty of Life Sciences and Informatics. and the Zhob Campus which accommodates BS programs in economics, business administration, and computer science.

Central Campus
The campus is situated on Quetta Chaman Road in the northwest of the city. Along with four faculties, the campus houses the central administration of the university as well as provide student dormitories, bachelor lodges, and homes to staff with families.

Non-central campuses
The university operates on three sub-campuses namely City campus, Chiltan campus, and Zhob campus. City campus is the founder building of BUITEMS allocated by the provincial cabinet of Balochistan. The building was formerly Primary Education Directorate. The campus is reserved for research studies on Bioinformatics, agricultural technologies, medical diagnostics and environment management. It has tube wells, greenhouses, tissue culture laboratories and research farms facilities for the students. University College of Zhob BUITEMS is a recently developed campus it is situated in District Zhob, Balochistan. The campus offers undergraduate programs in Economics, Business Administration, and Computer Science and is functional since spring 2018.

Academics
BUITEMS follows a quarter system with spring quarter commencing in early March and fall quarter starting in mid-August. The university follows a full-time, four-year undergraduate program except for Bachelors of Architecture which is a five-year long program. The undergraduate programs are eight semesters long with each semester spread over eighteen weeks. Undergrad students are required to take 15-18 credit hours every semester and 6 credit hours at end of the program for a final year project. The graduate programs are two years long with a minimum duration of 1.5 years. Grad students enroll for the courses that make up to a maximum of 12 credit hours in a single semester. They have to complete 24 credit hours course work and six credit hours research thesis for the completion of their degree. As of 2017 BUITEMS has a 14:1 student-teacher ratio.

University authorities and administration

The Senate
The BUITEMS Senate is the authoritative body, with 17 members. It is responsible for the governance of the university and reflects university-wide policies. The Chancellor of the university chairs the Senate and has the supervision powers over the university. The Vice-Chancellor and other university authorities are held accountable for all functions of the university.

BUITEMS syndicate
The syndicate is the top executive body of the university. The body has 15 members and is primarily responsible for raising education levels including teaching, research, and publications. They supervise university property and general affairs related to students and staff.

Selection board
BUITEMS has a fully authorized employee and staff selection board. It is a 12-member body composed of Vice-chancellors of the major provincial institutes as well as heads of the five faculties. The board is headed by Vice Chancellor and is solely responsible for hiring new academic and administrative staff members.

Faculties

Faculty of Arts & Basic Sciences
Mathematics 
Physics
Chemistry
Mass Communication
International Relations
English Literature 
Fine Arts
Sociology
Psychology

Faculty of Engineering and Architecture
Chemical Engineering
Textile Engineering
Petroleum & Gas Engineering
Mining Engineering
Geological Engineering
Civil Engineering
Mechanical Engineering
Architecture

Faculty of Information & Communication Technology
Electrical Engineering
Telecom Engineering
Computer Engineering
Electronics Engineering
Computer Science
Information Technology
Software Engineering

Faculty of Management Sciences
Management Sciences
Economics 
Public Administration

Faculty of Life Sciences and Informatics
Biotechnology and informatics
Microbiology
Environmental Sciences
Environmental Management and Policy

Basics

Libraries
BUITEMS has one central library with 40,000+ books. The individual campuses house a number of small departmental libraries. The libraries also provide students with free access to a world of books through digital library access. The books in the central library are managed through a fully automated library management system that assists in finding a book anywhere from the campus.

Art galleries
The main campus has a number of art galleries showcasing the collection of modern art ranging from artifacts, paintings, and sculptures made by the students of Faculty of Arts and Basic Sciences. Ir-relative of the course, students of other faculties also spend time and receive their share learning and knowing arts at the galleries.

Research center and senior design labs
The university provides resources and facilities for carrying out graduate research and undergraduate final year projects. The central research center was inaugurated in 2015 and is dedicated for graduate students to work at their designated research desks each equipped with computing and other related resources. For undergrad students, the campus holds senior design labs, workshop labs, and experimental laboratories where students are provided to work on their undergraduate projects.

Research and reputation
The institute's research activities are governed by the Office of Research, Innovation, and Commercialization (ORIC) led by Dr. Anayatullah Baloch. It is responsible for promoting and enhancing quality research activities and publications. The office assists in Board of studies and conducts Advanced Studies and Research Board (ASRB) meetings to review research projects and coordinate with the academic departments for holding research activities. Research funding are sponsored by different national and international sponsoring agencies including Higher Education Commission, ALP (Agricultural Linkage Program),Ministry of Science & Technology, Pakistan Science Foundation (PSF), International Science Foundation, World Health Organization (WHO), FAO / International Atomic Energy Agency (IAEA), International Fund for Agricultural Development (IFAD), and NIH USA. The Research Grants Program provides support for research projects in the following fields of Biotechnology and Informatics, Basic and Applied Sciences, Engineering, Information Technology, Administrative Sciences, and Arts. Projects funded by ORIC mainly focus national interest and funds both academic and industrial projects. In the 2012-2017 session, the university spent 10501691.63 RS in research.

Student life
BUITEMS is the patron of the annual Quetta Literary Festival (www.quettalf.org). Buitems Olympiad is the annual festival held by BUITEMS every year. It is the largest student-managed socio-cultural festival. It is a one-week festival and is normally held in October. Competition activities include cultural show competitions, sports, chess, scrabble etc. This festival brings together the students of both compasses (city campus, Takatu campus) and administrations to organize different competitions. Around 1000 athletes participate in this event from among students and staff member. Apart from this Students Affairs plays a vital role in organizing many other extra-Curricular activities throughout the year. It conducts at least three events in a week which includes guest lectures, workshops, and other related activities. Competitions include programming competitions, wall art competition, and robotics. These events aim to introduce students to various technical fields, research happening in various fields and entrepreneurship development.
Business Incubation is another annual competition held by BUITEMS which allows students to think out of the box and present business ideas. 
BUITEMS has a sports complex which consists of a table tennis court, badminton, volleyball, tennis courts. Fully equipped Gym is part of the sports complex. Cricket Stadium and football ground is another opportunity for cricket and football lovers.
Community service has been another important aspect of life at BUITEMS. BUITEMS faculty members happily volunteer their time for performing community service and transforming their lives to become better citizens and learn more dynamically. Students and staffs of BUITEMS work as volunteers in activities like educating the poor whose families are unable to finance their children, helping the citizens of the province in their career planning through various career counseling programs. Besides these, a large number of citizens have been helped by BUITEMS with BUITEMS blood donation.

References

Educational institutions established in 2002
2002 establishments in Pakistan
Computer science institutes in Pakistan
Universities and colleges in Quetta District
Engineering universities and colleges in Pakistan
Quetta
Public universities and colleges in Balochistan, Pakistan